The Two-woman competition at the IBSF World Championships 2019 was held on March 2 and 3, 2019.

Results
Run 1 and 2 were started on March 2, at 11:30 and the last two runs on March 3 at 11:34.

References

Two-woman